Stefania Zambelli (born 6 April 1971 in Salò) is an Italian politician who was elected as a Member of the European Parliament in 2019.

References

1971 births
Living people
MEPs for Italy 2019–2024
21st-century women MEPs for Italy
Lega Nord MEPs
People from Salò